Molitorosa is a genus of spiders in the family Lycosidae. It was first described in 1960 by Roewer. , it contains only one Brazilian species, Molitorosa molitor.

References

Lycosidae
Monotypic Araneomorphae genera
Spiders of Brazil
Taxa named by Carl Friedrich Roewer